The 2009–10 California Golden Bears men's basketball team represented the University of California, Berkeley in the 2009–10 NCAA Division I men's basketball season. This was head coach Mike Montgomery's second season at California. The Golden Bears played their home games at Haas Pavilion and participate in the Pacific-10 Conference. The Golden Bears finished the season 24–11, 13–5 in Pac-10 play to win the regular season conference championship, their first regular season title since the 1959–60 season. They lost to Washington in the finals of the Pac-10 tournament. They received an at–large bid to the 2010 NCAA Division I men's basketball tournament, earning an 8 seed in the South Region. They defeated 9 seed Louisville in the first round before falling to 1 seed and AP #3 Duke in the second round. The Blue Devils went on to claim their fourth national title.

Pre-season
In the Pac-10 preseason poll, released October 29 in Los Angeles, California during the Pac-10 media days California was selected to finish 1st in the conference.

Roster

Coaching staff

Schedule and results
Source
All times are Pacific

|-
!colspan=9| Exhibition

|-
!colspan=9| Regular season

|-
!colspan=9| 2010 Pacific-10 Conference men's basketball tournament

|-

|-
!colspan=9| NCAA tournament
|-

|-

Notes
Point guard Jerome Randle was named the 2010 Pac-10 Player of the Year. He also became Cal's leading scorer on March 13, 2010 when Cal defeated UCLA 85-72 in the semifinals of the Pac-10 tournament, surpassing Sean Lampley with 1,790 career points.
 March 17, 2010 – Forward Omondi Amoke was suspended for violating team rules violation going into the NCAA tournament and did not play in the Bears' first round match against Louisville.

Rankings

*AP does not release post-NCAA Tournament rankings^Coaches did not release a Week 2 poll.

References

External links
CalBears.com

California
California
California Golden Bears men's basketball seasons
California Golden Bears men's b
California Golden Bears men's b